Pipiza is a genus Hoverflies, from the family Syrphidae, in the order Diptera. Most are dark hoverflies.

Biology
Larvae are feeders on gall forming aphids.

Species

References

Diptera of Europe
Diptera of North America
Pipizinae
Hoverfly genera
Taxa named by Carl Fredrik Fallén